This is the results breakdown of the 2015 United Kingdom general election.

Swing

The shares of votes of each party changed as follows:

The following table is a list of seats changing hands as a result of the election based on the results of the 2015 election compared to the General Election held in May 2010, and so notwithstanding the results of by-elections to the 55th Parliament.

The Conservative Party became the first party in government since the 1983 general election to increase the number of seats they held at a general election. In total they gained 24 seats to win an overall majority of 12. They gained six seats from Labour in England and two in Wales, while also winning 16 seats from their former coalition partners, the Liberal Democrats.

The Labour Party had a net loss of 26 seats, see table below. Although they did gain twelve seats in England from the Conservatives (eight of them in London) and 23 from the Liberal Democrats, they suffered their worst defeat in Scotland in the age of universal suffrage, losing forty of their forty-one seats to the Scottish National Party (SNP). They also had a net loss of one seat in Wales. Ed Miliband immediately resigned as leader, handing over temporarily to deputy leader Harriet Harman.

The SNP enjoyed their best election result, gaining forty seats from Labour and ten from the Liberal Democrats to hold 56 of Scotland's 59 constituencies. The other parties held one seat each.

The Liberal Democrats had been part of a coalition government with the Conservatives prior to the election with 57 seats in parliament. However, they held just eight seats, their worst election result since the old Liberal Party secured six seats in 1970. Of the five Liberal Democrat cabinet ministers, three lost their seats. They also lost 338 deposits. As a result, Nick Clegg, although he was one of the two surviving ministers, resigned as leader.

The Green Party and UK Independence Party (UKIP) each held one seat: UKIP, however, failed to defend Rochester and Strood, which it had won in a by-election in 2014.

Seats changing hands

England

East of England

East Midlands

London

North East

North West

South East

South West

West Midlands

Yorkshire and the Humber

Wales

Scotland

Northern Ireland

References

 
Election results in the United Kingdom